Jacob Ferdinand Munch (November 16, 1890 - June 8, 1966) was a Major League Baseball player.

External links

Major League Baseball outfielders
Philadelphia Athletics players
Baseball players from Pennsylvania
1890 births
1966 deaths
Suffolk Nuts players